Hugo Thielen (born 1946) is a German freelance author and editor, who is focused on the history of Hanover, the capital of Lower Saxony, in a lexicon of the city, another one especially of its art and culture, and a third of biographies. He co-authored a book about Jewish personalities in Hanover's history.

Life
Thielen studied German language and literature, philosophy and education at the University of Bonn from 1966, completing with the Staatsexamen in 1971. He has lived in Hanover from 1973, working as editor and author for various publishing houses. From 1983 to 1995 he was a freelance music critic for the Hannoversche Allgemeine Zeitung (HAZ). He is head of a Verlagsbüro, an office for freelance writers.

Publications 

First in 1998, Thielen and Waldemar R. Röhrbein, the retired director of the Historisches Museum Hannover, wrote a book about Jewish personalities in the history of Hanover, Jüdische Persönlichkeiten in Hannovers Geschichte. It is organised as a history of the city, beginning in 1303, with a focus on the contributions of Jewish personalities, rather than individual biographies. Around hundred persons are described in some detail, including the principal violinist of the court orchestra, Joseph Joachim. A second edition, completely revised by Thielen, appeared in 2013, in memory of 75 years after the November pogroms.

 Helmut Knocke, Hugo Thielen: Hannover Kunst- und Kultur-Lexikon: Handbuch und Stadtführer. Ed: Dirk Böttcher, Klaus Mlynek, Zu Klampen Verlag 2007
 Dirk Böttcher, Klaus Mlynek, Waldemar R. Röhrbein (eds.): Hannoversches Biographisches Lexikon. , Hanover 2002, .
 Klaus Mlynek, Waldemar R. Röhrbein, Dirk Böttcher, Hugo Thielen (ed.): Stadt Lexikon Hannover. Von den Anfängen bis in die Gegenwart. Schlütersche Verlagsgesellschaft, Hannover 2009, .
 Waldemar R. Röhrbein, Hugo Thielen: Jüdische Persönlichkeiten in Hannovers Geschichte, completely revised, extended and updated new edition, Hannover: Lutherisches Verlagshaus, 2013,

References

External links 
 

German opinion journalists
20th-century German journalists
1946 births
Living people
University of Bonn alumni